The following list of disasters in Great Britain and Ireland is a list of major disasters (excluding acts of war) which relate to the United Kingdom or Ireland, or to the states that preceded them, or that involved their citizens, in a definable incident or accident such as a shipwreck, where the loss of life was forty or more.

Over 1000 fatalities

200–999 fatalities

100–199 fatalities

Fewer than 100 fatalities

See also
 European windstorm
 List of accidents and disasters by death toll (worldwide)
 List of accidents and incidents involving commercial aircraft
 List of disasters in Antarctica by death toll
 List of disasters in Australia by death toll
 List of disasters in Canada by death toll
 List of disasters in Croatia by death toll
 List of disasters in New Zealand by death toll
 List of disasters in Poland by death toll
 List of disasters in the United States by death toll
 List of fires
 List of lifeboat disasters in Britain and Ireland
 List of natural disasters in the British Isles
 List of rail accidents in the United Kingdom
 List of rail accidents (worldwide)
 List of riots
 List of terrorist incidents
 List of train accidents by death toll
 List of wars and anthropogenic disasters by death toll (worldwide)
 Lists of shipwrecks
 United Kingdom casualties of war

Notes

References

External links
 Aviation Safety Network database
 Ships List wrecks site
 Durham Mining Museum site

United Kingdom disasters by death toll
United Kingdom
Death toll
Death in the United Kingdom
Disasters